Doruk Pehlivan (born 10 July 1998) is a Turkish handball player who plays for GWD Minden on loan from Industria Kielce and the Turkish national team.

References

1998 births
Living people
Turkish male handball players
Expatriate handball players in Poland
Turkish expatriate sportspeople in Poland
Vive Kielce players
Competitors at the 2018 Mediterranean Games
Mediterranean Games competitors for Turkey